D.B.V. Rowic is a Dutch basketball team based in Dordrecht. Founded on 1 April 1964, the team played in the first-level Eredivisie during the 1970s and 1980s. The team was known as Frisol/Rowic for sponsorships reasons, playing in green jerseys as this was the sponsor's color. After Frisol stopped as main sponsor, the team played in the second-tier Eerste Divisie. Rowic won the NBB Cup in 1981, under the sponsored named "Snel Reizen". 

In 2018, a new professional team from Dordrecht played in the Dutch Basketball League with Dutch Windmills.

Honours 
NBB Cup

 Champions (1): 1980–81

Sponsorship names 
Due to numerous sponsorship deals, Rowic knew the following names:

 Frisol/Rowic: (1972–1981)
 Snel Reizen: (1981–1982)
 Kador/Rowic: (1982–1984)

Players

All-time leaders 
From the Dutch Basketball federation database.

Individual awards

References 

Basketball teams in the Netherlands
Sport in Dordrecht
Basketball teams established in 1964